Lardil may refer to:

 Lardil people
 Lardil language